The College of Fine and Applied Arts (FAA) is a multi-disciplinary art school at the University of Illinois at Urbana–Champaign.

History of College of Fine and Applied Arts 
On October 3, 1921, a proposal was made by the University Senate to organize the Department of Architecture, the Division of Landscape Architecture, the School of Music and the Department of Art and Design into a College of Fine Arts. A committee, made up of faculty members, was appointed in 1928 to make recommendations, which were approved by the Senate on February 2, 1930. On March 12, 1931, the Board of Trustees established the college for the "cultivation of esthetic taste on the part of the student body at large ... and development of general artistic appreciation." The first dean was appointed in 1932.

Today, the college includes the Schools of Architecture, Art + Design, and Music; the Departments of Dance, Landscape Architecture, Theatre, and Urban + Regional Planning; Japan House; the Krannert Art Museum; the Krannert Center for the Performing Arts; and Sinfonia da Camera, the university's resident chamber orchestra. The college offers exhibitions, concerts, performances, lectures, master classes, and conferences in all areas of the performing and visual arts and for the designed and built environment.

Department of Urban + Regional Planning 
The University of Illinois has a history in the training of urban and regional planners, dating back to 1913 when Charles Mulford Robinson was appointed Professor of Civic Design in the University's Landscape Architecture Division. At that time, only the University of Illinois and Harvard University offered courses in urban planning. In 1945 the university authorized a master's degree in urban planning, and in 1953 an undergraduate degree was established. Both programs were offered in the Department of Landscape Architecture until 1965, when the Department of Urban Planning became its own academic unit. The department established the PhD in Regional Planning in 1983.

The Department of Urban and Regional Planning is one of the planning programs in the U.S., and it is one of very few programs that offers three degrees: a Bachelor of Arts in Urban Planning, a Master of Urban Planning, and a Doctor of Philosophy in Regional Planning. It also offers a Minor in Urban Planning, as well as joint master's degree options, including with Law, Architecture, and Business Administration.

Department of Landscape Architecture 
This department is rated nationally among the top fifteen programs. It offers a BLA, MLA, and PhD program.

Academic units and majors 
 University of Illinois School of Architecture
 School of Art + Design
 Art Education
 Art History
 Graphic Design
 Industrial Design
 Crafts: Metal/jewelry
 New Media
 Painting
 Photography
 Sculpture
 Department of Dance
 Department of Landscape Architecture
 Department of Theatre
 Acting
 Scenic Design and Technology
 Sound Design
 Lighting Design and Technology
 Costume Design and Technology
 Stage Management
 Theatre Studies
 School of Music
 Composition/Theory
 Conducting
 Jazz Studies
 Performance
 Music Education
 Musicology
 Piano Pedagogy
 Music Technology
 Department of Urban and Regional Planning
 Minors Include:
 Art and Design
 Architecture
 Music
 Landscape Architecture
 Urban Planning
 Theatre
 Community Art Education
 Art History

College facilities 
 Architecture Building
 Architecture East Annex One
 Art + Design Building
 Art East Annex Two
 Building Research Council (BRC)
 Dance Studio
 Erlanger House, Urbana, Illinois
 Flagg Hall
 Harding Band Building
 Japan House
 Krannert Art Museum
 Krannert Center for the Performing Arts
 Music Building
 Mumford Hall
 Noble Hall
 Smith Memorial Hall
 South Studios
 Temple Hoyne Buell Hall

Notable alumni 

 Max Abramovitz, B.S. 1929, architect of the Avery Fisher Hall of Lincoln Center and Assembly Hall on the Illinois campus
 Chris Britt, 2003, editorial cartoonist
 Temple Hoyne Buell, B.S., 1916
 Henry Bacon, 1884, architect of the Lincoln Memorial in Washington D.C.
 Mark Staff Brandl, B.F.A., 1978, artist and art historian
 Betsy Brandt, actress, most famous for role as Marie Schrader on Breaking Bad
 Jeanne Gang, B.S., 1986, founder and principal of the Chicago architecture firm Studio Gang
 Nathan Gunn, B.M.E., 1994, Grammy Award-winning operatic baritone
 Jerry Hadley, M.F.A., Grammy Award-winning operatic tenor
 Ralph Johnson, B.Arch, 1971, principal architect of the Perkins+Will
 Ang Lee, B.A. 1980, Academy Award-winning movie director (Best Director, Life of Pi, Brokeback Mountain)
 Nick Offerman, B.F.A., Theatre, 1993, actor
 César Pelli, M.Arch., 1954, architect of Petronas Twin Towers in Kuala Lumpur, Malaysia
 Chitra Ramanathan, B.F.A Painting 1993, M.B.A 1997, Artist and educator
 Nathan Clifford Ricker, D.Arch. 1873, architecture educator
 Alan Ruck, B.F.A., Theatre, 1979, actor
 Jay Ryan, B.F.A. 1994, artist and rock musician
 Carolee Schneemann, M.F.A., artist
 William Wegman, M.F.A., 1967, Art and Design, visionary video artist, photographer, conceptualist and author

References

External links 
 College of Fine and Applied Arts

Art schools in Illinois
Music schools in Illinois
Educational institutions established in 1867
Fine and Applied Arts
Arts organizations established in 1867
1867 establishments in Illinois